Dumi bin Pg. Masdal is a Malaysian politician who has been the State Assistant Minister. He has served as the Member of Sabah State Legislative Assembly (MLA) for Silam since May 2018. He is a member of the Sabah Heritage Party (WARISAN).

Election results

References

Members of the Sabah State Legislative Assembly
Sabah Heritage Party politicians
Living people
Year of birth missing (living people)